Iditarod Area School District (IASD) is a school district headquartered in McGrath, Alaska.

Schools
All are K-12 schools:
 Blackwell School - Anvik
 David Louis Memorial School - Grayling
 Holy Cross School
 McGrath School
 Top of the Kuskokwim School - Nikolai
 Innoko River School - Shageluk
 Takotna Community School

It also operates the IASD Distance Learning Center, headquartered in Eagle River.

Former schools:
 Lime School - Lime Village - Closed in 2007 as the school only had six students.
 Minchumina School - Lake Minchumina
 Telida

References

External links
 

School districts in Alaska
Education in Unorganized Borough, Alaska
Bethel Census Area, Alaska
Yukon–Koyukuk Census Area, Alaska